Britta Johanna Helena Johansson Norgren (born 30 March 1983) is a Swedish cross-country skier who has been competing since 2002. She won a bronze medal in the 4 × 5 km at the FIS Nordic World Ski Championships 2009 in Liberec. Her best individual finish at the FIS Nordic World Ski Championships is 26th in the individual sprint at Sapporo in 2007.

Johansson Norgren's best individual finish at the Winter Olympics was 11th in the 10 km event at Turin in 2006.

She has a total of eight individual victories at various levels up to 30 km since 2002. Johansson Norgren's best individual World Cup finish was eighth in the sprint event in Germany in 2006.

On 31 January 2016 she won the women's edition of the Marcialonga ski marathon race in Italy.

She won the Tjejvasan in 2016, On 25 February 2017, she once again won Tjejvasan. She also won Tjejvasan in 2019. and the ski marathon Vasaloppet in 2017 and 2019. In February 2020, she won Tjejvasan once again. On 26 February 2022, she again won the same race.

On 8 April 2022, she announced her retirement from cross-country skiing.

Cross-country skiing results
All results are sourced from the International Ski Federation (FIS).

Olympic Games

World Championships
 2 medals – (1 silver, 1 bronze)

World Cup

Season standings

Team podiums
 2 victories – (1 , 1 ) 
 8 podiums – (5 , 3 )

References

External links
 
 
 

1983 births
Living people
People from Uppsala Municipality
Cross-country skiers from Uppsala County
Cross-country skiers at the 2006 Winter Olympics
Cross-country skiers at the 2010 Winter Olympics
Cross-country skiers at the 2014 Winter Olympics
Swedish female cross-country skiers
Olympic cross-country skiers of Sweden
FIS Nordic World Ski Championships medalists in cross-country skiing